The  is a constituency that represents Shizuoka Prefecture in the House of Councillors in the Diet of Japan. It has four Councillors in the 242-member house.

Outline
The constituency represents the entire population of Shizuoka Prefecture. Since its inception in 1947, the district has elected four Councillors to six-year terms, two at alternating elections held every three years. The district has 3,052,579 registered voters as of September 2015. The Councillors currently representing Shizuoka are:
 Yuji Fujimoto (Democratic Party (DP), second term; term ends in 2016)
 Shigeki Iwai (Liberal Democratic Party (LDP), first term; term ends in 2016)
 Takao Makino (LDP, second term; term ends in 2019)
 Kazuya Shimba (DP, third term; term ends in 2019)

Elected Councillors

Election results

See also
List of districts of the House of Councillors of Japan

References 

Districts of the House of Councillors (Japan)